Sijerča is a village in the municipality of Kalinovik, Republika Srpska, Bosnia and Herzegovina.

Geography 
Sijerča is a village located about 52 kilometers south of Sarajevo and 18 kilometers east of Kalinovik, the Kalinovik municipality's capital. It is situated on a karst plateau, overlooking the Bistrica river canyon, Sjeračke Stijene, named after the village.

Demographics 
In 1961, the census recorded 175 inhabitants. In the 1960s and 1970s, due to urbanization, the population of the village diminished and Sijerča practically has no year-round inhabitants today.

For at least a century, four families lived in Sijerča: Elez, Purković, Tepavčević and Vučetić.

References

Villages in Republika Srpska
Populated places in Kalinovik